Elenga is a Congolese surname that may refer to:

Adou Elenga (1926–1981),  Congolese singer-songwriter, composer and guitarist
Zacharie Elenga, Congolese virtuoso guitarist and one of the founding fathers of modern Congolese music

Surnames of Congolese origin
Kongo-language surnames